Şahvələdli or Shahveledli or Shahvaladli may refer to:

Şahvələdli, Dashkasan, a village in the Dashkasan District of Azerbaijan
Şahvələdli, Jabrayil, a village in the Jabrayil District of Azerbaijan